Aulnois may refer to:

Aulnois, Vosges, a commune of Vosges, France
Aulnois, Belgium, a village in Hainaut, Belgium
Aulnois (river), a Franco-Belgian river